Talabonak (also Romanized as Talābonak) is a village in Shuil Rural District, Rahimabad District, Rudsar County, Gilan Province, Iran. At the 2006 census, its population was 42, in 15 families.

References 

Populated places in Rudsar County